Wacław Sobieski (October 26, 1872 in Lwów – April 3, 1935 in Kraków, Poland) was a Polish historian.

Biography
Sobieski was a professor at the Jagiellonian University in Kraków, a member of the Polish Academy of Learning (Polska Akademia Umiejętności (PAU), and author of many works on the history of Poland especially of the 17th century.

Among his pupils were Henryk Barycz, Władysław Czapliński, Oskar Halecki, Kazimierz Piwarski, Ludwik Kolankowski, Adam Lewak, Kazimierz Chodynicki, Stanisław Bodniak, Kazimierz Lepszy, Kazimierz Piwarski, Wacław Pociecha.

Publications
 Wacław Sobieski, Trybun ludu szlacheckiego (1905)
 Wacław Sobieski, Polska a hugenoci po nocy św. Bartłomieja (1910)
 Wacław Sobieski, Dzieje Polski (History of Poland, 1923–25)
 Wacław Sobieski, Archiwum Jana Zamoyskiego (1904)

External links 
Biography

1872 births
1935 deaths
Members of the Polish Academy of Learning
Academic staff of Jagiellonian University
20th-century Polish historians
Polish male non-fiction writers
19th-century Polish historians